Keith DeRose (born April 24, 1962) is an American philosopher teaching at Yale University in New Haven, Connecticut, where he is currently Allison Foundation Professor of Philosophy. He taught previously at New York University and Rice University.  His primary interests include epistemology, philosophy of language, philosophy of religion, and history of modern philosophy. He is best known for his work on contextualism in epistemology, especially as a response to the traditional problem of skepticism.

Education
DeRose graduated from Calvin College in 1984 with a B.A. in Philosophy. He then studied at UCLA, earning an M.A. in 1986 and a PhD in 1990; his dissertation was entitled Knowledge, Epistemic Possibility, and Skepticism, under Rogers Albritton. While at UCLA, he won the Robert M. Yost Prize for Excellence in Teaching (1988), was awarded the Griffin Fellowship in 1990, and won the Carnap Essay Prize in 1989 and again in 1990.

Selected publications
The Case for Contextualism. Knowledge, Skepticism, and Context, Oxford University Press, 2009.
"The Ordinary Language Basis for Contextualism and the New Invariantism," The Philosophical Quarterly, 2005.
"Direct Warrant Realism," in A. Dole and A. Chignell, ed., God and the Ethics of Belief: New Essays in Philosophy of Religion (Cambridge University Press, 2005).
"Single Scoreboard Semantics," Philosophical Studies, 2004. 
"Assertion, Knowledge, and Context," Philosophical Review, 2002; Philosopher's Annual, vol. 26.
"Solving the Skeptical Problem," Philosophical Review, 1995; Philosopher's Annual, vol. 18. 
"Contextualism and Knowledge Attributions," Philosophy and Phenomenological Research, 1992
"Epistemic Possibilities," Philosophical Review, 1991.
"Reid's Anti-Sensationalism and His Realism," Philosophical Review, 1989.

See also
 American philosophy
 List of American philosophers

References

External links
Personal homepage
C.V.

Christian philosophers
Calvin University alumni
1962 births
Living people
Rice University faculty
Yale University faculty
American Christian universalists
University of California, Los Angeles alumni
20th-century Christian universalists
21st-century Christian universalists
Christian universalist theologians
Epistemologists
Philosophers of language
Philosophers of religion
20th-century American philosophers
21st-century American philosophers